Justin Anderson (born January 16, 1991) is an American football linebacker who is currently a free agent. He was signed by the New York Giants as an undrafted free agent in 2014. He played college football at Louisiana–Lafayette.

Professional career

New York Giants
On May 10, 2014, he was signed to the New York Giants as an undrafted free agent. After an injury, he was cut by the Giants and did not make the 53-man roster. After an injury to starting middle-linebacker Jon Beason, Anderson was promoted to the active roster. He was waived on November 25.

Minnesota Vikings
Anderson was signed to the practice squad of the Minnesota Vikings on December 24, 2014. He was released on March 26, 2015.

Dallas Cowboys
On July 28, 2015, he was signed as a free agent by the Dallas Cowboys. He was waived injured on August 8.

New Orleans Saints
On August 17, 2015, Anderson was signed by the New Orleans Saints. On September 5, 2015, he was released by the Saints.

References

1991 births
American football linebackers
Dallas Cowboys players
Louisiana Ragin' Cajuns football players
Living people
Minnesota Vikings players
New Orleans Saints players
New York Giants players
People from Foley, Alabama
Players of American football from Alabama